Chris Cox (born 21 January 1984 in Bristol) is a mentalist magician – a self-proclaimed "mind reader who can't read minds". On television he stars in "Chris Cox's Mind Blowing Magic" on CBBC & BBC iPlayer and is "The Geek" in the award winning Killer Magic on BBC Three. He also stars in touring stage show The Illusionists and in the West End in Impossible. He is the only mind reader in history to play Broadway, London's West End and Sydney Opera House. In his radio career Chris was the writer and producer for Matt Edmondson on BBC Radio 1;  the assistant producer on The Chris Moyles Show.
 
Chris stars as The Mentalist in The Illusionists and has performed as part of their 2015 season at the Moon Palace Arena in Cancun, 2018 sold out South Africa tour at The Grand West Arena (Cape Town) and The Teatro at Montecasino Johannesburg and the 2018 US Tour performing at venues such as Starlight Theatre (Kansas City, Missouri), Fox Theatre (St. Louis) and Bass Performance Hall. 
 
In December 2018 & January 2019 he starred in The Illusionists Australian Tour at Canberra Theatre, Sydney Opera House. Queensland Performing Arts Centre and Regent Theatre, Melbourne. For spring 2019 Chris headlined The Illusionists Experience at the Eldorado Showroom in Reno before returning for an unprecedented third West End run this time in London's Shaftesbury Theatre with The Illusionists Direct From Broadway. Chris is now the only mind-reader in history to have played Broadway, London's West End and Sydney Opera House. 

During the 2019 Holiday Season Chris made his Broadway Debut in The Illusionists - Magic Of The Holiday's at the Neil Simon Theatre on Broadway during which he was a guest on NBC's Today show. In 2020 he embarks on another US Tour with The Illusionists

In 2018 his CBBC and BBC iPlayer series "Chris Cox's Mind Boggling Magic" launched with ten episodes where Chris reads the minds of children and some of the stars of The Dumping Ground including Annabelle Davis. Chris starred as Muddles alongside her father, Warwick Davis as Muddles in Snow White And The Seven Dwarfs Pantomime at New Victoria Theatre in 2016.

Cox performed his first major show – entitled Chris Cox He Can Read Minds? – at the 2006 Edinburgh Festival Fringe. Cox's second show, Everything Happens for a Reason ran at the Gilded Balloon during the 2007 Fringe before a one off performance at the Arts Theatre in London's West End. His show Chris Cox : Control Freak premiered at the 2008 Edinburgh Festival Fringe at the Pleasance after which it had a UK Tour and finished with a performance at the Southbank Centre in London. He also performed with Frank Skinner, Jonathan Ross, Tim Minchin and featured on the television programmes The Culture Show and The Mentalist Revealed.
 
His next major show, entitled "Chris Cox: Mind Over Patter", was premiered at the King Dome of the Pleasance during August 2009. It was met with 5 star reviews and gained Cox the Fest Buzz Twitter of the Year Award. Cox took highlights of the show to the Royal Opera House for a weekend of shows in September 2009. During the 2009 Edinburgh Fringe, he took part in Mark Watson's 24 Hour Show performing various mind-reading stunts including the prediction of Simon Amstell's choice of date in Blind Date. While at the Edinburgh Fringe, he also played the role of Eric Randolf in the Fringe First award winning The Hotel. Mind Over Patter went on to tour the UK in Spring 2010 before an extended, sell-out run at the 2010 New Zealand Comedy Festival. Cox performed at The Herald Theatre and read the mind of Rove McManus as part of the televised gala. He performed a final version of the show at the Udderbelly in London's Southbank Centre in May 2011 before replacing the show with a new one for the 2011 Edinburgh Fringe Festival.
 
The 2011 show for the Edinburgh Fringe Festival was called "Fatal Distraction". The show weaved a love based narrative around never seen before mind-reading stunts. It gained a collection of five star reviews before embarking on an international tour. Fatal Distraction won the 2011 Venue Magazine award for Best Comedy Show, beating Daniel Kitson (3rd) & The Bath Comedy Festival (2nd.). The show toured as part of the New Zealand Comedy Festival in Auckland & Wellington in 2012 picking up rave reviews. It returned for sell out dates to the Udderbelly in London in Spring 2012, 2013 and again in 2014. During one performance Chris ended up on the shoulders of Jonathan Ross as part of a trick.
 
Cox performed as part of Robin Ince & Friends at the 2009 TAM London event and again at TAM 2010 supporting his friend Tim Minchin. He appeared as part of Dick & Dom's Funny Business on BBC Two in February 2011. He produced a documentary on Minchin for BBC Radio 1 in December 2011. Cox and Minchin appeared together in an article about their friendship in The Independent in Spring 2012. He also produced Dan and Phil's Guide To Happiness for BBC Radio 1 along with creating the show My Playlist and producing the likes of Daniel Radcliffe, Maisie Williams, Jared Leto, Joss Whedon, Little Mix and others.
 
In 2012 Chris was invited to perform on the main stage at Shakespeare's Globe, Latitude Festival and Reading Festival. In April 2012 it was announced that Cox was developing a television show with SyFy with the working title of The Chris Cox Project.
 
In 2014 Chris starred in BBC Three's Killer Magic. In 2014 he appeared with Heston Blumenthal on Heston's Recipe For Romance for Channel 4, this was the start of Cox's creative relationship with Blumenthal. He is a creative consultant for Heston and the team at The Fat Duck.

For five weeks over the summer of 2015 Chris starred in the new West End show 'Impossible (magic show)' at the Noel Coward Theatre to rave reviews. He went on to tour the show round the UK in 2016 as well as star in second West End season before taking the show to Dubai Opera, Kallang Theatre (Singapore), Beirut and a Christmas Season at the Smart Araneta Coliseum in Manila.

He was also the theatrical magic consultant for Barnum (musical) at Menier Chocolate Factory, Dan & Phil's Amazing Tour Is Not On Fire and Dan & Phil's 2018 World Tour, Interactive Introverts. He is the Magic & Illusions Assistant For Harry Potter and the Cursed Child at Palace Theatre, London.

The Guardian has called him "One of the most exciting entertainers in Britain" and Time Out once said he "does tricks that would make Jesus proud".
 
Colin Murray was the co-director of his early stage shows, and was once a flatmate of Cox.
 
Outside of the world of magic Cox works alongside Matt Edmondson on TVOD for ITV2, produced the documentaries 'The Story Of Tim Minchin', 'Scott Mill's Perfect Christmas Single' and Dan & Phil's Guide To Happiness for BBC Radio 1. He produced the Mayor Of London's New Year's Eve Fireworks, was the Programme Associate for BBC One's show 'Now You See It'. and created the viral hit, Wolverine The Musical for Hugh Jackman
Cox left his producers post (of The Matt Edmondson Show) at BBC Radio 1 in 2015.

References

External links
Chris Cox's website
Magic Week item about Chris
Info about Cox's 2007 Edinburgh Show from Broadway Baby
Chris Moyles Show Blog
Chris Moyles Show Running Order talking about Cox
Details of Cox's 2009 Festbuzz Award

1984 births
Alumni of the University of Bristol
Television personalities from Bristol
English magicians
Mentalists
Living people
British comedians